Karen Feldman is an American designer, entrepreneur, and author.  Since founding ARTEL in 1998, she has built a globally recognized brand, opened two retail stores, and authored an award-winning Prague travel guidebook "Prague: ARTĚL  Style".

Early life
Born in 1969, Feldman grew up in the suburbs of New York City, graduated from Bard College in 1991, and moved to Prague in 1994.

ARTĚL crystal
Feldman is the founder and owner of ARTĚL, a luxury crystal glassware company based in Prague, Czech Republic.  Featuring Feldman's original design motifs, ARTĚL crystal is mouth-blown and hand-engraved by Czech artisans using centuries-old production methods. The company is named for an early-20th-century collective of Czech artisans whose dedication to preserving the traditional methods of handcraftsmanship led them to reject industrial production techniques. Feldman's unique blending of classic tradition and modern design sensibility is ARTĚL's stylistic signature.

ARTĚL crystal is sold in exclusive stores and boutiques in 27 countries around the world, including Bergdorf Goodman in New York, Paul Smith in London and Christian Dior in Paris.

ARTĚL glass has twice been featured in the Cooper-Hewitt Museum (in 2004 and 2006).

Design stores
Later in 2007, Feldman opened the flagship ARTĚL Design Store at Celetná 29 (entrance on Rybná) in Prague's Old Town, offering not only luxury crystal glassware but also a carefully curated selection of vintage and modern Czech design items. This store was featured in a 2009 New York Times article, "36 Hours in Prague."

Feldman opened a second ARTĚL Design Store, located at U Lužického semináře 7 in Prague's Mala Strana neighborhood, in 2010. This store earned ARTĚL the 2011 Gift & Decorative Magazine Retailers Excellence Award for Best Store Design.

Other designs
In addition to the dozens of motifs she has created for ARTĚL – ranging from bold geometric patterns to highly detailed depictions of flora, fauna, and sea life – Feldman has also designed custom glassware for several top luxury brands, including Rolls-Royce, Gucci, Burberry, and Asprey.

Collaborations
Feldman has collaborated with several well-known artists and designers, including Sol LeWitt, David Wiseman, Eva Eisler, Zdeněk Lhotský, Petr Nikl, František Skála, Studio Olgoj Chorchoj / Michal Froněk and Maxim Velčovský.

Awards and recognition
On behalf of ARTĚL, Feldman has received several prestigious awards and honors, including Showroom of the Year and Manufacturer of the Year at the 2009 Czech Grand Design Awards, and First Place at Designblok 2008.

Along with William B. Russell Jr. and Robert McQuilkin, Feldman was featured in a 2006 New York Times article on their collaborative approach to renovating and decorating a shared country house in Southern Bohemia.

Book published
In 2007, Feldman wrote and published "Prague, ARTĚL Style", a travel guidebook that Forbes Life described as being "the most clued-in guidebook on the city." The book was named "Best Travel Guide" at the 2008 Independent Publishers Awards.

Bibliography
Prague: ARTĚL Style by Karen Feldman (Editor Rob McQuilkin, Illustrated by Beverly Joel, Published by Artěl Books, 2007 ,  204 pages)

References

External links
ARTĚL website

Year of birth missing (living people)
Living people
American expatriates in the Czech Republic
Businesspeople from Prague
Writers from Prague